Anomochone is a genus of glass sponges in the family Tretodictyidae.

References

External links

Hexactinellida
Animals described in 1927
Sponge genera